The British School of Brussels (commonly abbreviated to BSB), is an international school in Belgium. It occupies a site of about 8 ha (19 acres) surrounded by woodland near the Royal Museum of Central Africa in the town of Tervuren, Flemish Brabant, east of Brussels. It has over 1350 students aged 1–18 years from approximately 70 nationalities. BSB consists of two schools: Primary (age 1–11) and Secondary (age 11–18).

BSB follows an English elementary school curriculum, and offers a bilingual English/French programme. Teachers are recruited among English and French native speakers. It offers programmes for pupils aged 4–14 in a 50/50 timetable covering both languages.

In 2016, BSB opened the Jacques Rogge Sports Centre on campus. The new Sports Centre includes: a 25m swimming pool, gymnastics arena, dance studio, fitness suite and multi-purpose sports hall.

History
The British School of Brussels was founded on 5 December 1969 by a group of businessmen led by Sir Dick Pantlin CBE, just as the UK was preparing to join the European Union. Pantlin went on to become the chairman of the board of Trustees and Honorary President of the school with Leslie Firman, the group's secretary. The school was also co-founded by Mike Goodman. The school's houses are named after them; Pantlin, Firman and Goodman. For its first few months it occupied temporary premises in the Rue de la Loi in Brussels. The School first opened on 15 September 1970 with 213 pupils aged 5–13 and 16 teaching staff including the first headmaster, Alan Humphries. On 9 December 1970, the Duke of Edinburgh officially opened the first building on the campus, then called Building 1. In 2004 all buildings were renamed after famous Belgian people or fictional characters such as Victor Horta and Tintin.

Primary
The Primary School curriculum is open for ages 1–11. The Primary School has dedicated facilities for each age group: Early Childhood Centre (ages 1–3), Lower Primary (age 3-7) and Upper Primary (age 7-11). Each part of the Primary School has its own school building and playground.

Secondary
At age 16, all students take either nine or ten GCSEs. 
Post-16, students are given the option to study for English A Levels, the International Baccalaureate Diploma or Business and Technology Education Council (BTEC) vocational courses in Applied Science, Business, Hospitality and Sport. Furthermore, students studying A-levels take the Extended Project Qualification in addition to normal exams.

Facilities
 25m swimming pool with movable floor
 Gymnastics arena
 Three multi-purpose sports halls
 Fitness suite furnished with Technogym equipment
 Dance studio
 Design and Technology workshop with CAD suite and 3D printer
 Post-16 centre, careers, and business suite
 Purpose-built 240-seat theatre
 Modern Science and Mathematics block
 Self-service Cafeteria seating 330
 Modern languages suite
 Specialist ICT Suite
 Recording studio
 Parents' centre with café, information centre and rooms for social activities.
 Woodland reserve for outdoor education

Clubs and activities
BSB offers students a broad and diverse range of extra-curricular activities, with clubs and activities taking place at both lunch time and after school.

Extra-curricular activities were further enhanced by the construction of the new Jacques Rogge Sports Centre, which was completed in 2016. The centre's facilities include: a 25m swimming pool, gymnastics arena, dance studio, fitness suite and a multi-purpose sports hall. Outdoor facilities are also extensive and include three floodlit all-weather pitches, as well as tennis courts and grass fields for rugby, football, and hockey matches.

Notable alumni 
Craig Dowsett (rugby player)
Victoria Hollins (journalist)
Nick Kennedy (rugby player)
Deborah Lawrenson (journalist and writer)
Katherine Rundell (novelist)
Matija Sarkic (football player for Wigan Athletic and the Montenegro national team)
Oliver Sarkic (football player for Leeds United and the Montenegro national team)
Stephen Rowbotham (Olympic rower)
Oliver Wilson (TV Producer)
Olivia Vinall (actress)
Benjamin Gorham (Realtor)

References

External links

 
 

Education in Brussels
International schools in Belgium
International Baccalaureate schools in Belgium
Brussels
Secondary schools in Belgium
1968 establishments in Belgium
Educational institutions established in 1969
Tervuren